This is a list of fighter aces in World War II from Southern Rhodesia. For other countries see List of World War II aces by country

See also
Southern Rhodesia in World War II

Notes and references
Notes

References

Southern Rhodesian World War II flying aces
Southern Rhodesia
World War II Flying aces
Southern Rhodesian military personnel of World War II